Coenoemersa is a genus of flowering plants belonging to the family Orchidaceae.

Its native range is Southern USA to Guatemala.

Species:

Coenoemersa cualensis 
Coenoemersa limosa 
Coenoemersa volcanica

References

Orchids
Orchid genera